Raymond Baten (born 26 January 1989) is an Aruban international footballer who plays for Dutch club ASV De Dijk, as a midfielder.

Career
Baten has played for Voorschoten '97, FC Rijnvogels, RKVV Westlandia, Quick (H) and ASV De Dijk.

He made his international debut for Aruba in 2011.

International goals
Scores and results list Aruba's goal tally first.

References

1989 births
Living people
Aruban footballers
Aruba international footballers
Voorschoten '97 players
FC Rijnvogels players
RKVV Westlandia players
H.V. & C.V. Quick players
ASV De Dijk players
Association football midfielders
Aruban expatriate footballers
Aruban expatriates in the Netherlands
Expatriate footballers in the Netherlands